

Khal Adas Yisroel, usually referred to as the Schiff Shul, was the main Orthodox synagogue in Vienna prior to the Holocaust. The synagogue no longer exists since it was destroyed by the Nazis on Kristallnacht. A building that was adjacent to the Schiffshul and was  part of its complex remains.

A small shul currently exists in this building that is called Bet Hamidrasch Khal Chassidim and is led by Rabbi Avraham Yona Schwartz. The upper level of the building has been functioning as a yeshiva since the 1940s and is headed by Rabbi Michoel Pressburger. It also serves as temporary spiritual refuge to thousands of Jewish refugees from Iran who have transited through Vienna over the past 30 years.

There is a memorial plaque at this site that states "This Jewish place of worship was destroyed by the Nazis in the pogrom of November 1938."

The Synagogue was located on Grosse Schiffgasse 8 in the second district of Vienna known as Leopoldstadt.

History 
With the constitution of the Israelitsche Cultus-Gemeinde (official Jewish Community) in 1852, the shul was established. The first rabbi was Rabbi Shlomo Zalman Spitzer (d. 1894) who was elected in 1852. He was a son in law of the Chasam Sofer 1763-1839 (Rabbi Moshe Sofer). As such, the community had a direct connection to the Pressburg Orthodox Community.  As the liberal contingent grew in influence Rabbi Spitzer led the observant Orthodox secessionist congregation to a new location, which was built from 1858 to 1864. The new synagogue counted 750 seats (500 for men, 250 for women).

Rabbi Yeshaya Fuerst (d. 1943), succeeded Rabbi Spitzer in 1894. He was a disciple of the Ksav Sofer 1815-1872 (Rabbi Avrohom Shmuel Binyamin Sofer) and he too had close ties to the Pressburg Orthodox Community.

The Cantor of the shul prior to the Holocaust was Avrohom Braun, who was hired in 1922. The shamash (sexton) was Reb Hersh Lipschutz, who immigrated to the US, where he was active in the Vienner Shul.

With the approach of the Holocaust and the Anschluss, in March 1938, Rabbi Fuerst fled for his life from Vienna and died in England in 1943.

Some members of the persecuted community succeeded in reaching America and settled in Williamsburg. These refugees reestablished a kernel of the Vienner community in the then Agudath Israel headquarters on Bedford Avenue on May 15, 1941. They named the new congregation Khal Adas Yereim and invested great energy in its development. Like its antecedent, the Congregation prayed in Nusach Ashkenaz. In 1948 the Vienner Shul moved to a new building on Rodney and South 5th Street, and appointed Rabbi Yonasan Steif as its Rabbi. Due to the community's growth they moved in the mid 50s to a larger building on 27 Lee Avenue. Today the Williamsburg congregation bears little resemblance to its predecessor due to the mostly Chassidic nature of the community. There is a branch of the Vienner shul in Borough Park at 1350 50th St.

References

Literature 
 Bob Martens, Herbert Peter: "The Destroyed Synagogues of Vienna - Virtual city walks". Vienna: LIT Verlag, 2011.

External links 
 Schiffschul, austriansynagogues.com
 DAVID | Die Wiener Schiffschul
 History of Jewish Vienna 
 Transit. The Iranians in Vienna. Photographs by Christine de Grancy, Exhibition at the Jewish Museum Vienna

1852 establishments in the Austrian Empire
1945 establishments in Austria
Ashkenazi Jewish culture in Austria
Ashkenazi synagogues
Schiffschul
Schiffschul
Hasidic Judaism in Europe
Hasidic synagogues
Iranian diaspora in Europe
Iranian-Jewish diaspora
Orthodox Judaism in Austria
Orthodox synagogues
Religious organizations established in 1852
Synagogues completed in 1864
Schiffschul
Schiffschul

Yiddish words and phrases
20th-century architecture in Austria
19th-century architecture in Austria